The Statute Law Revision Act 1958 (6 & 7 Eliz 2 c 46) is an Act of the Parliament of the United Kingdom.

The enactments which were repealed (whether for the whole or any part of the United Kingdom) by this Act were repealed so far as they extended to the Isle of Man on 25 July 1991.

Sections 1 to 3, and Schedules 1 to 3, were repealed by section 1 of, and Part XI of the Schedule to the Statute Law (Repeals) Act 1974.

Section 4 - Re-enactment of provision of Government War Obligations Acts, 1914 to 1919, as to payment of certain pensions, and repeal of remaining provisions thereof
Section 4(1) provides:

Section 4(2) was repealed by section 1 of, and Part XI of the Schedule to the Statute Law (Repeals) Act 1974.

Section 5
This section was repealed by section 41(1) of, and Part I of Schedule 6 to, the Northern Ireland Constitution Act 1973.

See also
Statute Law Revision Act

References
Halsbury's Statutes. Fourth Edition. 2008 Reissue. Volume 41. Page 761.

External links
The Statute Law Revision Act 1958, as amended, from the National Archives.

United Kingdom Acts of Parliament 1958